Kevin Eugene Newman AO (10 October 193317 July 1999) was an Australian soldier and politician. He was a member of the Liberal Party and held ministerial office in the Fraser Government, serving as Minister for Repatriation (1975–1976), Environment, Housing and Community Development (1976–1977), National Development (1977–1979), Productivity (1979–1980), and Administrative Services (1980–1983). He represented the Tasmanian seat of Bass in the House of Representatives from 1975 to 1984. His wife Jocelyn also became a federal government minister, while his son Campbell became premier of Queensland.

Army career
He rose to the rank of colonel in the Australian Army, serving in Malaysia and the Vietnam War.

Political career

Newman entered political life through a 1975 by-election for the Division of Bass, Tasmania, in the House of Representatives, as the Liberal candidate.  The previous member, former Labor Deputy Prime Minister Lance Barnard, had held it for 21 years, though he had been gradually losing support in recent years. Newman had already been preselected for the next election, and had been nursing the seat for some time.

Nonetheless, it came as a surprise when Newman took the seat off Labor with a massive 14-point swing, turning Bass into a safe Liberal seat at one stroke.  He won 57.6 percent of the primary vote, enough to win without the need for preferences. This shock result is reckoned as the beginning of the end for Prime Minister Gough Whitlam, as Newman's victory emboldened the Coalition to push for new elections for a House of Representatives barely a year old—even to the point of blocking supply. The Whitlam government was dismissed six months later.

Newman easily retained his seat at the December 1975 general election.  With the election of the Fraser government, he was appointed Minister for Repatriation in the second Fraser Ministry.  In July 1976, he became Minister for Environment, Housing and Community Development when Ivor Greenwood became ill. He was responsible for environment issues when the decision was taken to cease sand mining on world heritage listed Fraser Island.

In December 1978, Newman was appointed Minister for National Development in the third Fraser Ministry.  In December 1979 he was appointed Minister for Productivity and in November 1980 he was appointed Minister for Administrative Services in the fourth Fraser Ministry, a position he retained until the defeat of the government in the 1983 election.  He retired from the parliament prior to the 1984 election.

Post-political activities
In retirement, Newman was appointed President of the National Trust Tasmania, a member of the board of the Menzies Foundation and a director of the Australian Stockman's Hall of Fame in Longreach, Queensland.

Newman was the Chairman of the Old Parliament House Governing Council from 1997 to 1999.

He was appointed an Officer of the Order of Australia in the Queen's Birthday Honours of 1994.

Family
Newman was married to Jocelyn Newman, a Senator for Tasmania, and Minister for Family and Community Services and Minister Assisting the Prime Minister for the Status of Women in the Howard government. They had two children: Kate and Campbell. Campbell Newman was the Lord Mayor of Brisbane 2004–11, and was Premier of Queensland from March 2012 to February 2015.

References

1933 births
1999 deaths
Members of the Australian House of Representatives for Bass
Members of the Australian House of Representatives
Liberal Party of Australia members of the Parliament of Australia
Officers of the Order of Australia
Australian colonels
Australian military personnel of the Vietnam War
Australian military personnel of the Malayan Emergency
Spouses of Australian politicians
Deaths from lupus
20th-century Australian politicians